Douglas Fregin is a Canadian businessman who co-founded BlackBerry Limited (then called Research In Motion) in 1984. Fregin acted as vice-president of operations until his retirement in 2007. Fregin was awarded an Honorary Doctorate of Engineering by the University of Waterloo on June 19, 2022 for his achievements.

See also 
 List of Canadians by net worth

Notes 

Canadian businesspeople